Peter Westerhaus (born December 4, 1992) is an American football player who played for the Minnesota Golden Gophers.

Peter attended Holy Family Catholic in Victoria, Minnesota, where he won the Minnesota Mr. Football Award in 2010 while leading the Fire to the Class 3A state championship game, where they lost to Lourdes High School. He was named second-team All-American as a tight end by Rivals.com.
Westerhaus was forced to retire from football because of ulcerative colitis. On May 4, 2014, he received the Courage Award from The Minnesota Chapter of the National Football Foundation for his strength in overcoming adversity.

References

1992 births
Living people
American football linebackers
Minnesota Golden Gophers football players
People from Chanhassen, Minnesota
Players of American football from Minnesota